Phil Demmel (born April 2, 1967) is an American musician who played lead guitar in the heavy metal band Machine Head between 2002 and 2018, making him their longest running member in that position. He has also performed in other bands such as Vio-lence, Torque Metal Allegiance and BPMD, and briefly played with Slayer, Nonpoint, Overkill and Lamb of God as a fill-in guitarist.

Biography
In 1996, Demmel auditioned for lead vocals with Sepultura as the replacement for Max Cavalera, but lost that position to Derrick Green.

Demmel joined Machine Head shortly before the recording of the 2003 album Through the Ashes of Empires. He began touring with Machine Head in 2002. He was long time friends with Machine Head frontman Robb Flynn, either since or before they both played in Vio-lence.

In 2007 Demmel appeared as a guest on the album DDP 4 Life with Chuck Billy's and Steve Souza's Dublin Death Patrol.

Demmel has suffered from a loss of consciousness and fainting several times while playing live with Machine Head. At first believed to be a side effect of dehydration, Demmel has since said that an existing heart condition was the cause. On the subject of his collapse whilst playing in Bristow, Virginia, he said,

"I've suffered from episodes of Cardiogenic Syncope for the last 17 years or so but (doctors) ran a series of tests that came up inconclusive. I hadn't had it happen for a while until last December in Italy, when I passed out roughly about the time my father passed away back in the States. The incident in Virginia felt similar to what has happened in the past"

Demmel announced his engagement to Bleeding Through's keyboardist Marta Peterson in January 2012. Before that, he had two children.

Following Demmel's departure from Machine Head in November 2018, musical outlets reported there were rumors that he would reunite with Vio-lence, who planned to do shows and possibly release new material "in the not too distant future". A reunion of the band was officially confirmed on January 8, 2019, and it has been performing occasional live shows since then. The band will release their first recording in 29 years, Let the World Burn, as an EP on March 4, 2022.

In December 2018, Demmel joined Slayer for a few shows on their final European tour, filling in for his friend Gary Holt who left the tour to be home with his dying father.

In summer 2019, Demmel joined forces with Overkill vocalist Bobby "Blitz" Ellsworth and two-fourths of Metal Allegiance (bass guitarist Mark Menghi and drummer Mike Portnoy) in the supergroup/cover band BPMD, which released its first album, American Made, in June 2020.

Demmel filled in for Dave Linsk (who was unable to perform) at an Overkill concert in New Jersey on November 13, 2021, and two months later, he filled in for Willie Adler during Lamb of God's performance at ShipRocked.

In April 2022, Demmel filled in as bass guitarist for Lamb of God, and in October of that year performed with the band as the first time they had ever played with three guitarists live.

In January 2023, on ShipRocked, Demmel, Tyson Leslie, of Vixen, and Jack Ivins comprised the backing band for Living Colour's Corey Glover.

Equipment

Since his days with Vio-Lence, Demmel has always used Jackson guitars. He first used Randy Rhoads models, then later in the 1990s he began using a white King V. When he joined Machine Head he had his white V and a Jackson Warrior which can be seen in the videos for "Imperium" and "Days Turn Blue to Gray". Around the time of The Blackenings release he had his own signature V with Jackson, named The Demmelition King V.

For amplification, he uses Peavey 5150 and 6505 amplifiers with Marshall 1960BV cabinet in the studio. Live, he has recently turned to the AxeFX pre-amplifier for practical reasons.

References

External links

1967 births
Living people
20th-century American guitarists
American heavy metal guitarists
American male singers
American heavy metal singers
Lead guitarists
Machine Head (band) members
People from Dublin, California
Vio-lence members
American male guitarists
20th-century American male musicians